Pollard Ball and Roller Bearing Company with its headquarters at Ferrybridge, West Yorkshire was a manufacturer of ball and roller bearings founded by John King. Formerly it had been known as Ferrybridge Industries and was originally a small family motor repair firm, Whitehouse Motor Industries, Ford dealers. Ferrybridge owned Pollard Bearings Limited.

International
Subsidiaries were established in France, Canada and USA. In 1964 30 per cent of the trade was direct with the motor industry in Germany, Italy, France and Sweden as well as USA

Industrial Reorganisation Corporation
In May 1969 government pressure exerted through the Industrial Reorganisation Corporation required the sale of all the capital of Pollard to Ransome & Marles. The grounds for the pressure were given to be as follows: 
the ball bearing industry was a large sector of engineering technology  and an essential input into the motor and aircraft industries; 
when compared with other developed countries the British industry was fragmented; 
there was a possibly of a merger of Sweden's Skefko and Ransome & Marles. SKF dominates the market in European countries. 
There would be advantages of scale. 
Ransome & Marles was the leading British owned company.

References

Bearing manufacturers
Manufacturing companies of the United Kingdom